Leti is a village in the Punjab Province of Pakistan. The name is derived from a shallow water stream.

Government 
Leti is a union council, an administrative subdivision of Chakwal District, and is part of Lawa Tehsil. Sukka village is also part of the union council.

Economy 
The village is located in an agricultural area that primarily grows wheat, cotton, rice, and corn. In order to be more productive, recommendations by Muhammad Aslam from the Sarhad Journal of Agriculture, (Dec 2016, vol 32,4 p. 258-423) include, in part, education through training and extension services, improving irrigation water management, reclamation of salinised land, and new price policies.

Culture 
Leti is famous for its local sport called kabaddi, a contact team sport involving tagging out opposing team players within the time it takes to hold a breath.  Leti is also famous for its bull races.

References

Union councils of Chakwal District
Populated places in Chakwal District